Noel Victor Starblanket (September 26, 1946 – April 15, 2019) was a Canadian politician. For two terms from 1976 to 1980 he was chief of the National Indian Brotherhood (today known as the Assembly of First Nations).

Early years and education
Born at Fort Qu'Appelle Indian Hospital in Fort Qu'Appelle, Saskatchewan, he was a Cree from the Starblanket Indian Reserve near Balcarres, Saskatchewan, in Treaty 4 territory.

Starblanket spent eleven years at Qu'Appelle Indian Residential School and was abused while there. Some of his memories are recorded in The Survivors Speak: a report of the Truth and Reconciliation Commission of Canada and the e-book Shattering the Silence. Additionally, Regina filmmaker Trudy Stewart produced a short documentary film, From Up North.

Starblanket attended law school at the University of Saskatchewan.

Career
In 1971, at age 24, Starblanket became one of the youngest reserve chiefs in Canada. He was elected Third Vice-Chief of the Executive of the Federation of Saskatchewan Indians (FSIN) and Director of Treaty Rights and Research. In 1975, he was elected president of the National Indian Brotherhood and was re-elected in 1978.

As part of the "Indian Film Crew", an early effort in Indigenous filmmaking at the National Film Board of Canada (NFB), Starblanket was one of the filmmakers (with Mike Mitchell) on the 1969 documentary film, You Are on Indian Land, and worked on the Ballad of Crowfoot, among others. In 1973, the NFB released a 27-minute film, Starblanket. in which, starting at 19:25 he discusses his desire in to start a farm for reserve members (see SIAP, Federation of Sovereign Indigenous Nations). 

Starblanket was asked to consider the position of Assistant Deputy Minister of Indian Affairs in 1980. He spoke at the economics conference at the World Assembly of First Nations when President of the National Indian Business Association (NIBA).

Starblanket, Morley Watson and Vern Bellegarde envisioned a Native hockey team and spurred the formation of the Lebret Eagles."

In March 2001 he gave the keynote speech at the annual conference of the Association of Death Education and Counseling. In 2001 he was interviewed for a project and the documentary, Starblanket: A Spirit Journey was later produced.

In 2018, Starblanket became Elder-in-residence at Scott Collegiate, a high school in Regina. He worked with the University of Regina's Office of Indigenization. Speaking January 13, 2019.

Personal life and demise

Starblanket died at age 72 on April 15, 2019 at a hospital in Regina, Saskatchewan, from complications of diabetes.

Further reading
 Saskatchewan Indian: Noel Starblanket new NIB Pres. (September 1976)
 Saskatchewan Indian: National Indian Brotherhood: 9th Annual General Assembly (September 1978)
 Collections Canada: Noel Starblanket profile

References

External links
 Past National Chiefs of NIB/AFN
 Watch the documentary Starblanket at NFB.ca

1946 births
2019 deaths
Assembly of First Nations chiefs
Cree people
Indigenous leaders in Saskatchewan